Noah The New Year 2022 was a professional wrestling event promoted by CyberFight's sub-brand Pro Wrestling Noah. It took place on January 1, 2022, in Tokyo, Japan, at the Nippon Budokan. The event aired on CyberAgent's AbemaTV online linear television service and CyberFight's streaming service Wrestle Universe. It was the first pay-per-view promoted by Noah in 2022.

Background

Storylines
The event featured ten professional wrestling matches that resulted from scripted storylines, where wrestlers portrayed villains, heroes, or less distinguishable characters in the scripted events that built tension and culminated in a wrestling match or series of matches.

Event

Preliminary matches
The event started with the confrontation between the teams of Junta Miyawaki and Kinya Okada, and Kai Fujimura and Yasutaka Yano which solded with the victory of the preceding team. In the second bout, Funky Express (Akitoshi Saito, King Tany and Mohammed Yone) defeated Kongo (Manabu Soya, Nio and Tadasuke) in six-man tag team action. Next, Kongo (Aleja and Hao) outmatched the team of Stinger (Seiki Yoshioka and Yuya Susumu). The fourth bout saw Hajime Ohara, Momo No Seishun Tag (Atsushi Kotoge and Daisuke Harada) and Último Dragón picking a victory over Los Perros del Mal de Japón (Eita, Kotaro Suzuki, Nosawa Rongai and Yo-Hey) in eight-man tag team action. Next up, Kazuyuki Fujita and Kendo Kashin defeated Ikuto Hidaka and Masakatsu Funaki. In the sixth match, Hayata secured the eighth consecutive defense of the GHC Junior Heavyweight Championship against Stinger stablemate Yoshinari Ogawa. In the seventh match, Keiji Muto and Naomichi Marufuji defended the GHC Tag Team Championship for the first time against M's Alliance stablemates Masaaki Mochizuki and Masato Tanaka. Next up, Kenta and Sugiura-gun (Kazushi Sakuraba and Takashi Sugiura) defeated Daiki Inaba, Masa Kitamiya and Yoshiki Inamura. In the semi main event, Kenoh secured the second consecutive defense of the GHC National Championship against Kaito Kiyomiya.

Main event
In the main event, Katsuhiko Nakajima defeated Go Shiozaki to mark his third consecutive defense of the GHC Heavyweight Championship.

Results

References

External links
Pro Wrestling Noah official website

Pro Wrestling Noah
CyberAgent
2022 in professional wrestling
January 2022 events in Japan
Professional wrestling in Tokyo
Pro Wrestling Noah shows